Breakfast in Hollywood, also known as The Mad Hatter, is a 1946 American comedy film directed by Harold D. Schuster and written by Earl Baldwin. The film stars Tom Breneman, Bonita Granville, Beulah Bondi, Edward Ryan, Raymond Walburn, Billie Burke, ZaSu Pitts, Hedda Hopper, Andy Russell, Spike Jones and Nat King Cole. The film was released on February 26, 1946, by United Artists.

Plot
A woman comes to Hollywood to meet her fiancé, who does not show up.  Given a ticket to a radio show, she meets a sailor who was a friend of her fiancé.  The sailor falls in love with the girl, before he tells her that her fiancé had married someone else.  The girl, angry with the boy's advances, leaves on a bus to return to her home in Minnesota.  The radio program host plays a fairy godmother role, having the police arrest the girl, and reunite the couple, who decide to get married.

Cast  
Tom Breneman as Tom Breneman
Bonita Granville as Dorothy Larson
Beulah Bondi as Mrs. Annie Reed
Edward Ryan as Ken Smith
Raymond Walburn as Richard Cartwright 
Billie Burke as Mrs. Frances Cartwright
ZaSu Pitts as Elvira Spriggens
Hedda Hopper as Hedda Hopper
Andy Russell as Andy Russell 
Spike Jones as Spike Jones
Nat King Cole as Nat King Cole

References

External links 
 

1946 films
American black-and-white films
Films directed by Kurt Neumann
United Artists films
1946 comedy films
American comedy films
Films directed by Harold D. Schuster
Films based on radio series
1940s English-language films
1940s American films
English-language comedy films